Curtis Park station is a station along the SEPTA Wilmington/Newark Line  and Amtrak's Northeast Corridor. Amtrak does not stop here; the station is only served by SEPTA. The station is officially located at Elmwood Avenue near Calcon Hook Road in Sharon Hill, Pennsylvania. In reality it is located at the dead ends of Oak Avenue, one block east of Calcon Hook Road, and is accessible from Calcon Hook Road from Woodlawn Terrace on the north side of the tracks and Elmwood Avenue from the south side.

According to the Pennsylvania Railroad Stations Past & Present website, Curtis Park was originally known as Academy prior to 1948. It was believed to have been named from a local branch of the Holy Child Academy which was once located nearby. The station has been closed and boarded up but still stands as a pair of platformed shelters, dividing Oak Avenue into two halves on either side of the railroad lines while Calcon Hook Road crosses over the lines. The station building was built by or for the Pennsylvania Railroad when the name was changed as the Curtis Publishing Company moved to town.

Station layout
Curtis Park has two low-level side platforms with walkways connecting passengers to the inner tracks. Amtrak's Northeast Corridor lines bypass the station via the center tracks.

References

External links
SEPTA – Curtis Park Station
 Station from Google Maps Street View

SEPTA Regional Rail stations
Stations on the Northeast Corridor
Railway stations in Delaware County, Pennsylvania
Former Pennsylvania Railroad stations
Railway stations in the United States opened in 1949
Wilmington/Newark Line